Galium leptogonium is a plant species in the family Rubiaceae. Common name is rock bedstraw. It is found only in Australia but widespread there, found in every state except Tasmania.

Galium leptogonium  is very similar to G. migrans. Many herbarium specimens of G. leptogonium were formerly labeled as G. migrans. Galium leptogonium  is an herb with thin, angled stems and lanceolate leaves in whorls of 4. Leaves and stems are usually covered with hairs but not always. Flowers are creamy white or very pale green. Fruiting capsules are roundish, dull and smooth.

References

External links
Florabase, the Western Australian Flora, Galium leptogonium 
Atlas of Living Australia  Galium leptogonium 
Wetland Info, Queensland Government, Galium leptogonium 

leptogonium
Flora of Queensland
Flora of South Australia
Flora of Western Australia
Flora of New South Wales
Flora of Victoria (Australia)
Plants described in 2009